George Frederick "Deke" White (September 8, 1872 – November 5, 1957) was an American professional baseball pitcher with the Philadelphia Phillies in the  season. 

In 3 career games, he had a 1–0 record with a  9.87 ERA. He batted right and left and threw left-handed.

White was born in Albany, New York and died in Ilion, New York.

External links
Baseball Reference.com page

1872 births
1957 deaths
Philadelphia Phillies players
Baseball players from New York (state)
Major League Baseball pitchers
Sportspeople from Albany, New York
19th-century baseball players
Amsterdam Carpet Tacks players
Lancaster Maroons players
People from Ilion, New York